Viburnum rhytidophyllum, the leatherleaf viburnum, is a species of Viburnum, native to Asia.

The leaf stems are fuzzy brown. In spring, fragrant creamy-white flowers bloom in clusters. Blue berries form in June and become plump through September, maturing to glossy black.

The plant is an evergreen shrub or small tree with a suckering habit. The leaves are opposite, crinkled, downy on the underside, less so on the upper surface.

Cultivation and uses
It is commonly grown as an ornamental plant for its evergreen foliage and tolerance of deep shade.

References

rhytidophyllum
Garden plants